Greenside Law is a hill in the Manor Hills range, part of the Southern Uplands of Scotland. The lowest Donald hill in the range, it is situated at the head of the Manor Valley, with its position somewhat in-between the adjacent ridges on its west and east. The easiest ascents (i.e. those with paths) are from the Manor Valley itself to the north, or Craigierig Farm to the south.

References

Mountains and hills of the Southern Uplands
Mountains and hills of the Scottish Borders
Donald mountains